MS Seattle was a German cargo ship. The cargo on board varied, but she transported mostly timber and lumber. On the last trip she also carried 30,000 boxes of oranges. The last trip of the ship had been dramatic. She was taken under blockade in the Dutch Antilles. The blockade was broken, the ship escaped and the course was set northwards to Iceland. From there she traveled to Tromsø in Northern Norway, from where the ship had received permission from the neutral Norwegian authorities to sail around the Norwegian coast and into the Baltic Sea. Her last stop in Norway was Kristiansand, where she was forced to port by the Norwegian Navy vessel HNoMS Gyller 8 April.

The ship was at dawn 9 April 1940 on the way from Kristiansand when she came under crossfire between the German cruiser  and other German invaders and the Norwegian Odderøya Fortress. The Norwegian forces thought that she was a supply vessel that supported the German forces and began firing on her with their 150 mm cannons. She turned and headed back to the harbor of Kristiansand. Seattle was subjected to fierce shelling and caught fire. The crew went to the lifeboats while she was abandoned, burning. Once the crew came ashore, they were held as prisoners of war until the following day. Seattle was drifting to burn out for several days. She then started taking in water and sank.

Her wreck is a popular but highly dangerous target for divers. Several fatal accidents have occurred at the wreck. The wreck is listed by the Norwegian Directorate for Cultural Heritage.

References

External links
Kampen om Kristiansand by the German Rear Admiral Otto Schenk (1940) 

1928 ships
Maritime incidents in April 1940
Ships built in Hamburg
World War II merchant ships of Germany
World War II shipwrecks in the North Sea
Ships sunk by coastal artillery